Take Off (Hanja:國家代表, literally "National Representative" or "National Athlete" or "National Team") is a 2009 South Korean film written and directed by Kim Yong-hwa. The film was the 2nd most attended film of the year in South Korea with 8,392,953 admissions.

Plot
Cha Heon-tae, a Korean-born American, was adopted with his sister to American parents. He appears on a Korean television program in search of his mother. Since Heon-tae is a trained alpine skier, he is approached by Coach Bang who wants to recruit members for a new national ski jumping team for the approaching 1998 Winter Olympics. The other members are Choi Hong-cheol, a night club waiter; Ma Jae-bok, who works at a meat restaurant and has a strict father; and Kang Chil-gu, who lives with his grandmother and autistic brother Bong-gu. All are good skiers, but are out of practice. To gear up for the qualifying match at the World Cup, they overcome their fear and train in unusual places, such as from the top of cars, amusement park roller coasters, etc. After almost getting disqualified because of a fight the night before, they succeed in qualifying at the World Cup. But the victory is bittersweet once they hear the IOC opted for Salt Lake City over Korea's Muju County. Unfortunately, because of deep fog, Chil-gu injures his leg and becomes unable to compete. Bong-gu decides to jump as a substitute but does not make the required distance for a gold medal and nearly loses his life. Despite their loss, the athletes rejoice because Bong-gu survived the jump, and the Koreans back home are proud of them.

Cast

Ha Jung-woo - Cha Heon-tae/Bob
Kim Dong-wook - Choi Hong-cheol 
Kim Ji-seok - Kang Chil-gu
Choi Jae-hwan - Ma Jae-bok
Lee Jae-eung - Kang Bong-gu
Sung Dong-il - Coach Bang
Lee Eun-sung - Su-yeon
Shin Soo-yeon - Ri Ji-hye (young)
 Ma Dong-seok	(Cameo)
Lee Hye-sook - Bob's birth mother
Lee Se-rang - Middle-aged woman from Yanbian, China
Juni - Young woman from Yanbian, China
Lee Han-wi - Company president Ma
Kim Yong-gun - Chairman of the organizing committee
Hwang Ha-na - Ji-eun (Bob's younger sister)
Seo Min-yi - 3 year old Ji-eun
Kim Ji-young - Bong-gu's grandmother
Oh Kwang-rok - Pharmacist
Kim Su-ro - Loan shark boss
Jo Seok-hyeon - Employee at Military Manpower Administration
Park Seong-taek - Japanese broadcaster
Kim Sung-joo - Korean broadcaster
Cho Jin-woong - Korean broadcaster 2
Lee Seol-ah - Hye-ra
Jung Min-sung - Classifieds journalist
Henny Savenije - German sports anchor
Richard Wilson - Finnish sports anchor

Relevance
Korea is new to the venue of ski jumping, and there were only five members of the national team, so this event is not well known to the Korean people. Film director Kim Yong-hwa made this movie to introduce the ski jumping event to Koreans, in order to pique their interest and therefore improve national support for the event. In order to do that, he cast top actor Ha Jung-woo. Kim also introduced the background on the players and the environment in which they practiced. This was the first Olympics in which the Korean ski jump team competed, so they did not receive much financing. Therefore, they had to practice in a bad training area. Despite this, they managed to attend the Olympics.

Accolades

Sequel
The sequel Take Off 2 is directed by Kim Jong-hyun, and its predominantly female cast is led by Soo Ae, playing a North Korean defector who becomes a national ice hockey player. Also starring Kim Seul-gi, Jin Ji-hee and Oh Dal-su, the film began shooting in October 2015.

References

External links
 

2009 films
Films about the 1988 Winter Olympics
Films about Olympic ski jumping
Films directed by Kim Yong-hwa
Showbox films
South Korean sports drama films
2000s sports drama films
2000s South Korean films